Benicia was a barquentine built by Matthew Turner in Benicia, California in 1899. She was known for a fast passage from Newcastle, New South Wales to Kehei, Hawaii, of 35 days.

Benicia was wrecked on Lafolle Reef off Haiti on 10 October 1920.

Turner's influence on schooner Benicia

At least two other sailing vessels also carried the name Benicia. Gibbs reports that Turner's influence on the South Seas schooner was still evident as late as 1941, when a two-masted schooner, Benicia, built in Tahiti by a shipwright who had worked in Turner's yard, arrived in San Francisco under the French flag.

1883 iron ship Benicia
An 899-ton iron ship named Benicia was launched in Oct. 1883, for Liverpool owners, by Whitehaven Iron Shipbuilding Co.

References

Barquentines
Schooners of the United States
Individual sailing vessels
Merchant ships of the United Kingdom
Ships built in Benicia, California
Shipwrecks of Haiti
Maritime incidents in 1920
1883 ships
1899 ships